John Dixon Lindsay (8 September 1908 – 31 August 1990) was a South African cricketer who played in three Tests in 1947. His son, Denis, also played Test cricket for South Africa.

He captained North Eastern Transvaal in their initial first-class season in 1937–38.

References

1908 births
1990 deaths
People from Senqu Local Municipality
Cape Colony people
South African people of British descent
South Africa Test cricketers
South African cricketers
Northerns cricketers
Gauteng cricketers
Wicket-keepers